Jakeem Grant Sr. (born October 30, 1992) is an American football wide receiver for the Cleveland Browns of the National Football League (NFL), usually operating as a return specialist. He was drafted by the Miami Dolphins in the sixth round of the 2016 NFL Draft and has also played for the Chicago Bears. He played college football at Texas Tech, where he set their all-time record for receiving yards. On December 12, 2021, Grant broke the Bears' franchise record for longest punt return for a touchdown by scoring on a 97 yard punt return in a game against the Green Bay Packers at Lambeau Field in Green Bay, Wisconsin. The return is the tenth longest punt returned for a touchdown in NFL history.

High school career
Grant attended  John Horn High School in Mesquite, Texas and was a three-star prospect rated by Rivals.com. He held offers from Colorado State, Iowa State, Louisiana Tech, Pittsburgh, Texas Tech, Tulsa, Vanderbilt, and Wake Forest. He was originally committed to Tulsa but flipped his commitment to Texas Tech soon before Signing Day.

College career

Texas Tech
Grant redshirted during his first season in 2011. In the following 2012 season, Grant played in all 13 games and recorded 32 receptions, 287 yards, and three touchdowns. He returned a kickoff for a 99-yard  touchdown in the 2012 Meineke Car Care Bowl of Texas. He earned ESPN All-Big 12 1st Team Freshman honors following the season.

In 2013, Grant played in 12 games for 65 receptions, 796 receiving yards, seven touchdowns, and was named All-Big 12 Conference Honorable Mention.

In 2014, Grant played in 12 games for 67 receptions, 938 receiving yards, seven touchdowns, and again earned All-Big 12 Conference Honorable Mention honors.

In his final season, in 2015, Grant was selected as a CBS Sports second-team All-American and an Associated Press third-team All-American in 2015 as an all-purpose player. Grant caught 90 passes for 1,268 yards and 10 touchdowns, which broke Biletnikoff Award winning Red Raider Michael Crabtree's school record in career yardage. Grant returned an additional two kickoffs for touchdowns during the season, setting the school record for the category.

During Texas Tech's Pro Day, a New Orleans Saints scout recorded his 40-yard dash speed at a hand-timed 4.1 seconds, potentially beating Bo Jackson's hand-timed 4.12 seconds at the NFL Combine in 1986. His electronically recorded 40 yard dash time is 4.34 seconds.

College statistics

Professional career

Miami Dolphins

After running a 4.42 and 4.38 40-yard dash at his Texas Tech pro day, Grant was drafted by the Miami Dolphins in the sixth round, 186th overall, of the 2016 NFL Draft.

2016 season
On October 9, 2016, Grant's first career touchdown came on a 74-yard punt return against the Tennessee Titans in Week 5 of his rookie season. The return made 'NFL Now's Top 5 Most Athletic Plays' list at number 1.

2017 season
In the 2017 season, Grant appeared in all 16 games and recorded 13 receptions for 203 receiving yard and two receiving touchdowns.

2018 season
In Week 1 of the 2018 season, Grant had a 102-yard kick off return touchdown in a 27–20 win over the Tennessee Titans, earning him AFC Special Teams Player of the Week. In Week 3, against the Oakland Raiders, he had two receptions for 70 yards and two touchdowns in the victory. Grant recorded a 70-yard punt return touchdown in Week 5 against the Cincinnati Bengals. He suffered an Achilles injury in Week 10 and underwent season-ending surgery.

2019 season
On August 20, 2019, Grant signed a four-year contract extension with the Dolphins. In Week 11 in the 2019 season, Grant returned a kickoff for a touchdown, this for 101 yards in a 37–20 loss against the Buffalo Bills. On November 27, Grant was placed on injured reserve with a high ankle sprain. In the 2019 season, he appeared in ten games and recorded 19 receptions for 164 receiving yards.

2020 season
On November 1, 2020 against the Los Angeles Rams, Grant returned a punt for an 88 yard touchdown during the 28–17 win.  During the game, Grant set three Dolphins team franchise records: longest punt return (88 yds), three career punt returns for a touchdown, and five returns for a touchdown.
On November 4, 2020, Grant was named the AFC Special Teams Player of the Week for his performance in Week 8. Once the season concluded Grant earned Second-team All-Pro honors for his performance as a punt returner. Grant appeared in 14 games and recorded 36 receptions for 373 receiving yards and one receiving touchdown.

Chicago Bears
Grant was traded to the Chicago Bears on October 5, 2021, in exchange for a sixth-round selection in the 2023 NFL Draft. His first appearance on the team was in week 5 in a game against the Raiders.

In Week 13, Grant had five receptions for 62 yards and a touchdown in a 33-22 loss to the Arizona Cardinals. In Week 14, Grant had one reception for 46 yards and a touchdown, and also returned a punt for a 97 yard touchdown, each in the first half, in the 45-30 loss to the Green Bay Packers, earning NFC Special Teams Player of the Week.

Cleveland Browns
On March 16, 2022, Grant signed a three-year contract with the Cleveland Browns. He was placed on injured reserve on August 10, 2022, after injuring his Achilles tendon during practice.

Personal life
He grew up in a Dallas, Texas, single parent home with his mom, Sylvia Whittaker, and two brothers, Markeith Whittaker and Keonte Grant. Grant attended John Horn High School. He was stabbed in a nightclub in 2014. He is now married and has three children.

In 2016, Grant starred in the NFL Network's TV series Undrafted.

References

External links
Texas Tech Red Raiders bio
Miami Dolphins bio

1992 births
Living people
African-American players of American football
Players of American football from Texas
People from Athens, Texas
American football wide receivers
American football return specialists
Texas Tech Red Raiders football players
All-American college football players
Miami Dolphins players
John Horn High School alumni
21st-century African-American sportspeople
Chicago Bears players
Cleveland Browns players